An achromatic lens or achromat is a lens that is designed to limit the effects of chromatic and spherical aberration. Achromatic lenses are corrected to bring two wavelengths (typically red and blue) into focus on the same plane. Wavelengths in between these two then have better focus error than could be obtained with a simple lens.

The most common type of achromat is the achromatic doublet, which is composed of two individual lenses made from glasses with different amounts of dispersion. Typically, one element is a negative (concave) element made out of flint glass such as F2, which has relatively high dispersion, and the other is a positive (convex) element made of crown glass such as BK7, which has lower dispersion. The lens elements are mounted next to each other, often cemented together, and shaped so that the chromatic aberration of one is counterbalanced by that of the other.

In the most common type (shown), the positive power of the crown lens element is not quite equalled by the negative power of the flint lens element. Together they form a weak positive lens that will bring two different wavelengths of light to a common focus. Negative doublets, in which the negative-power element predominates, are also made.

History
Theoretical considerations of the feasibility of correcting chromatic aberration were debated in the 18th century following Newton's statement that such a correction was impossible (see History of the telescope). Credit for the invention of the first achromatic doublet is often given to an English barrister and amateur optician named Chester Moore Hall. Hall wished to keep his work on the achromatic lenses a secret and contracted the manufacture of the crown and flint lenses to two different opticians, Edward Scarlett and James Mann.  They in turn sub-contracted the work to the same person, George Bass.  He realized the two components were for the same client and, after fitting the two parts together, noted the achromatic properties. Hall used the achromatic lens to build the first achromatic telescope, but his invention did not become widely known at the time.

In the late 1750s, Bass mentioned Hall's lenses to John Dollond, who understood their potential and was able to reproduce their design. Dollond applied for and was granted a patent on the technology in 1758, which led to bitter fights with other opticians over the right to make and sell achromatic doublets.

Dollond's son Peter invented the apochromat, an improvement on the achromat, in 1763.

Types
Several different types of achromat have been devised. They differ in the shape of the included lens elements as well as in the optical properties of their glass (most notably in their optical dispersion or Abbe number).

In the following, R denotes the radius of the spheres that define the optically relevant refracting lens surfaces. By convention, R1 denotes the first lens surface counted from the object. A doublet lens has four surfaces with radii R1 to R4.

Littrow doublet
The back of the flint glass lens is flat. A Littrow doublet can produce a ghost image between R2 and R3 because the lens surfaces of the two lenses have the same radii.

Fraunhofer doublet (Fraunhofer objective)
The first lens has positive refractive power, the second negative. R1 is set greater than R2, and R2 is set close to, but not equal to, R3. R4 is usually greater than R3. In a Fraunhofer doublet, the dissimilar curvatures of R2 and R3 are mounted close, but not in contact. This design yields more degrees of freedom (one more free radius, length of the air space) to correct for optical aberrations.

Clark doublet
Early Clark lenses follow the Fraunhofer design. By about 1880, Clark lenses had R3 set slightly shorter than R2 to create a focus mismatch between R2 and R3, thereby avoiding ghosting caused by reflections within the airspace.

Oil-spaced doublet
The use of oil between the crown and flint eliminates the effect of ghosting, particularly where . It can also increase light transmission slightly and reduce the impact of errors in R2 and R3.

Steinheil doublet
The Steinheil doublet, devised by Carl August von Steinheil, is a flint-first doublet. In contrast to the Fraunhofer doublet, it has a negative lens first followed by a positive lens. It needs stronger curvature than the Fraunhofer doublet.

Dialyte
Dialyte lenses have a wide air space between the two elements. They were originally devised in the 19th century to allow much smaller flint glass elements down stream since flint glass was hard to produce and expensive. They are also lenses where the elements can not be cemented because R2 and R3 have different absolute values.

Design
The first-order design of an achromat involves choosing the overall power  of the doublet and the two glasses to use. To make the linear dispersion of the system zero, the system must satisfy the equations

Since , and the Abbe numbers are positive-valued, the power of the second element in the doublet is negative when the first element is positive.

Further color correction

Lens designs more complex than achromatic can improve the precision of color images by bringing more wavelengths into exact focus, but require more expensive types of glass, and more careful shaping and spacing of the combination of simple lenses:
 apochromatic lenses bring three wavelengths into a common focus and requires costly materials
 superachromatic lenses bring four wavelengths into focus and must be manufactured with even more expensive fluoride glass and to considerably tighter tolerances
In theory, the process can continue indefinitely: Compound lenses used in cameras typically have six or more simple lenses (e.g. double-Gauss lens); several of those lenses can be made with different types of glass, with slightly altered curvatures, in order to bring more colors into focus. The constraint is extra manufacturing cost, and diminishing returns of improved image for the effort.

See also
 Barlow lens

References

External links

Lenses